Awes-kon-wa is a Native American mythological figure of the Iroquois Mohawk people. It is described as a small, winged sprite.

References

Mohawk culture
Iroquois legendary creatures
Sprites (folklore)